= V. S. Rishi =

Indian social worker (1913–2007)

V. S. Rishi (15 July 1913 – 15 July 2007) was an Indian social worker and the founder Secretary of Abhaya Nilayam.

Rishi died on 15 July 2007, on his 94th birthday.
